The 2004 United States House of Representatives elections in Virginia were held on November 2, 2004 to determine who will represent the Commonwealth of Virginia in the United States House of Representatives. Virginia has eleven seats in the House, apportioned according to the 2000 United States Census. Representatives are elected for two-year terms.

Overview

District 1

District 2

District 3

District 4

District 5

District 6

District 7

District 8

District 9

District 10

District 11

References

See also
 2004 United States House  of Representatives elections

Virginia
2004
2004 Virginia elections